Dakson Soares da Silva (born 11 July 1987 in Santana do Ipanema), or simply Dakson, is a Brazilian footballer who currently plays for Sousa Esporte Clube as an attacking midfielder.

Career

Lokomotiv Plovdiv 
Dakson signed for Lokomotiv Plovdiv at the age of 19, in the summer of 2006. He made his competitive debut on 19 August 2006 against Slavia Sofia in the third round of the A PFG. He is regarded by many to be one of the best players in the Bulgarian Football League and a great prospect for the future. He has also expressed an interest in obtaining Bulgarian citizenship.

On 4 October 2009, in a match against Levski Sofia he saved his team the point with a brilliant equalizer in the added time of the second half, scoring from a free kick from a distance of about 40 meters. On 19 April 2010, Dakson played his hundredth match for Lokomotiv in a 0–0 away draw against Sliven 2000. On 25 March 2012, Dakson was sent off in a 3–0 home loss against CSKA Sofia after an altercation with Njongo Priso. In his last official match for Loko Plovdiv that was held on 11 July and was part of the 2012 Bulgarian Super Cup competition, Dakson scored his team's only goal in the 1–2 loss against Ludogorets Razgrad.

Vasco da Gama 
On 20 July 2012, Dakson signed for Vasco da Gama on a long-term contract for a fee believed to be around €180,000. He made his debut in the Campeonato Brasileiro Série A on 24 November, in a 1–1 home draw against Flamengo, coming on as a substitute for Jonathan Marlone. On 2 December, Dakson assisted Éder Luís for Vasco's second goal in a 2–1 away win over Fluminense.

He netted his first goal on 31 January 2013, in a 2–4 home loss against Flamengo in the Campeonato Carioca.

Club statistics
As of 1 October 2017

Honours
CRB
 Campeonato Alagoano: 2016

 Cuiabá
 Campeonato Mato-Grossense: 2017

References

External links
 Brazilian FA Database
 Dakson at Youtube
 

1987 births
Living people
Brazilian footballers
First Professional Football League (Bulgaria) players
Campeonato Brasileiro Série A players
Sportspeople from Alagoas
PFC Lokomotiv Plovdiv players
CR Vasco da Gama players
Esporte Clube Vitória players
Clube Náutico Capibaribe players
Clube de Regatas Brasil players
Cuiabá Esporte Clube players
Brusque Futebol Clube players
Agremiação Sportiva Arapiraquense players
Expatriate footballers in Bulgaria
Brazilian expatriate sportspeople in Bulgaria
People from Santana do Ipanema
Association football midfielders
Sousa Esporte Clube players